Events from the year 1970 in South Korea.

Incumbents
President: Park Chung-hee 
Prime Minister: Chung Il-kwon (until 20 December), Paik Too-chin (starting 20 December)

Events
 October 14 – 1970 Onyang-dong level crossing accident, according to MLIT of ROK official announced, 42 persons fatalities in Chungcheongnam-do.
 December 14 – Sinking of Namyoung-Ho, according to Coast Guard of ROK, official announced, 326 persons were fatalities, only seven persons were rescued.

Births
 April 18 - Kim Kyung-Wook, archer
 July 16 - Wang Hee-kyung, archer
 September 13 - Kim Sun-il, interpreter and Christian missionary (d. 2004)

Deaths

 November 13 - Jeon Tae-il, workers' rights activist (b. 1948)

See also
List of South Korean films of 1970
Years in Japan
Years in North Korea

References

 
South Korea
Years of the 20th century in South Korea
South Korea
1970s in South Korea